Natalya Roshchupkina (born 13 January 1978 in Lipetsk) is a Russian heptathlete. She represented Russia at the 2000 Sydney Olympics and was three times a participant at the World Championships in Athletics (1999, 2001, 2003). She also competed twice at the European Athletics Championships.

Roshchupkina won two international titles: the 1999 European Athletics U23 Championships and the 2001 Goodwill Games. Her best placing at a global championships was fourth, achieved at both the 2001 IAAF World Indoor Championships and the 2001 World Championships in Athletics. Her personal best for the heptathlon is 6633 points, set in 2000.

International competitions

Circuit performances
Hypo-Meeting
1999 (5th), 2000 (2nd), 2001 (3rd), 2002 (11th)

Personal bests
200 metres – 23.27 sec (2001)
800 metres – 2:06.67 min (2001)
100 metres hurdles – 13.70 (2000)
High jump – 1.91 m (2000)
Long jump – 6.45 m (2000)
Shot put – 14.96 m (2001)
Javelin throw – 45.65 m (2001)
Heptathlon – 6633 pts (2000)

References

sports-reference

1978 births
Living people
Sportspeople from Lipetsk
Russian heptathletes
Olympic heptathletes
Olympic athletes of Russia
Athletes (track and field) at the 2000 Summer Olympics
Goodwill Games medalists in athletics
Competitors at the 2001 Goodwill Games
World Athletics Championships athletes for Russia
Russian Athletics Championships winners
Goodwill Games gold medalists in athletics